According to one version of the Navajo creation story, Black God is first encountered by First Man and First Woman on the Yellow (third) world. Black God is, first and foremost, a fire god. He is the inventor of the fire drill and was the first being to discover the means by which to generate fire. He is also attributed to the practice of witchcraft. Black God is not portrayed in the admirable, heroic fashion of other Navajo Gods. Instead, he is imagined as old, slow and apparently helpless. Other times he is imagined as a “a moody, humorless trickster” who “passes himself off as poor so that people will be generous to him.”

Appearance
Black God has a crescent moon on his forehead, a fullmoon for a mouth, the Pleiades on his temple and he wears a buckskin mask covered in sacred charcoal with white paint.

Genealogical mythology
Black God's father is Fire and his mother is Comet.

Creation of the Stars
The creation story of the Navajo people is recounted as part of a Blessingway Ritual: “The Sky and the Earth were placed after the People emerged from a series of previous worlds. Four Holy People – First Man, First Woman, Salt Woman, and Black God – [sat together and] planned the conditions of life on the surface of the earth.” Still more, these four figures are collectively responsible, not just for the organization of all things terrestrial, but for the placement of the stars themselves. Of the four, however, because of his association with fire, the Navajo saw Black God as responsible for the creation, and sustaining of the celestial bodies.
As the story goes, First Man, First Woman, Salt Woman were sitting in a hogan (a Navajo hut made of wood and dirt) when Black God entered with the constellation of Pleiades affixed to his ankle. “When several of the Holy People commented on the presence of this constellation, Black God stamped his foot vigorously, bringing the constellation to his knee. A second stamp…  brought the stars to his hip.” The Holy People were impressed by Black God's display and nodded approvingly.  Black God then stamped his foot a third and fourth time, until the constellation was lodged in his temple. Satisfied, Black God declared: “There it shall stay!” The Holy People were so captivated by Black God's performance that they gave him the responsibility of creating constellations with which to adorn the “upper dark.” Black God acquiesced, carefully arranging his star crystals throughout the heavens until the night sky was beautified by his glittering constellations. Yet, the crystals had no light of their own, and the night sky remained dark. “To solve this problem, Black God placed some of his fire in the sky by providing an igniter star to radiate light for each constellation.” Black God went on to impart his fire unto the sun.

Milky Way creation story
In another story, Black God is set about the cosmic work of meticulously assembling constellations in an otherwise empty sky. One by one, he pulls each star from a pouch strung around his waist, sets it ablaze, and affixes it to the firmament. When Coyote sees this he becomes impatient. Snatching Black God's pouch away from him, Coyote scatters the remaining stars into the sky forming the Milky Way. As Black God did not have the chance to light the stars Coyote scattered, this story explains why some stars are dimmer than others  In another version of the story, Black God made the Milky Way on purpose.

Constellations
Like many ancient cultures, the Navajo people looked to the sky and saw a story in each constellation. These stellar fables functioned as an enduring "cultural text" which was said to "record [the] laws that… govern mankind for all time.” The Constellation of Pleiades and its placement on the mask of Black God is emblematic of the Navajo philosophy of ‘Sa’a naghai bk’e hozho’ which pertains to the Nightway ritual and its fundamental goal of the restoration of balance, beauty, health, and wholeness.

Black God and the Pleiades
The constellation Pleiades was of particular importance to the Navajo people. Not only was the celestial body ingrained in their mythology, but it served a greater utilitarian purpose. Pleiades’ progress across the sky throughout the winter months renders it a sort of celestial ‘clock’ for gauging the number of hours until dawn.

Ritual Significance
Despite his importance in the act of creation, Black God (or Haashch’eezhini) appears very seldom in Navajo ritual. The only sacrament involving Him is the Nightway (or Yeibichai), a nine-day midwinter healing ceremony. On the ninth and final day of the ritual, a man arrives in the guise of the Black God. It is not uncommon for Black God to be portrayed by an old man dressed in traditional garb including: fox skin, black body paint, and the Black God mask. The impersonator carries with him a fire-drill (a device that uses friction to incite ignition) and shredded bark (tinder) with which he will demonstrate his pyromancy.

Rival Gods
There is a conflict between Black God, as the God of Fire, and Begochidi, the creator of birds and animals. This tension originates from the destruction that  Black God's fire has wrought on Begochidi's creations. 
Strangely enough, this rivalry persists despite Black God becoming the protector of said creations in another story. In the story of Deer Raiser, humans have begun to hunt in ways other than those that the gods had ordained. Seeing this, Black God hides game animals inside his home, Black Mountain, and surrounds it with poisonous plants to further ward against intruders.

References

Fire gods
Navajo mythology
Stellar gods